Mounagiri (Devnagari: मौनागिरी अभय हनुमान मंदिर  )  is a Hindu temple near Bengaluru Highway in Anantapur, India. The temple displays millennia of traditional Hindu and Andhra culture, spirituality, and architecture. The temple was inspired and developed by Sri Eswaraiah Swamy, the spiritual head of the Mounagiri Global Trust and Philosophical Society, whose 500 volunteers helped 1,000 artisans construct the Mounagiri Hanuman Temple.

Features

Monument

The temple is located in a peaceful environment outside the city without any disturbances occurring. The temple construction work is still under process, and is going very slowly due to the financial problems, and looking for donors to finish the construction of the temple.

Location and contact information

The temple is located in Hampapuram Village, Bengaluru highway (NH 44), Ananthapuramu district (formerly Anantapur), Andhra Pradesh, 7.4 km from Rapthadu Mandal. Buses are available from all places in Andhra Pradesh and Telangana, Bengaluru, and Chennai to reach this temple.

The nearest railway station is Anantapur, 12.6 km away. Buses and private taxis are available while the nearest airport is Sri Sathya Sai Airport in Puttaparthi, 71 km away from the temple.

Gallery

External links

 Official website on Anantapur by National Informatics Center

Hindu temples in Anantapur district
Hanuman temples
21st-century Hindu temples
Religious buildings and structures completed in 2010

ca:Anantapur
es:Anantapur
hi:अनन्तपुर जिला
bpy:অনন্তপুর
it:Anantapur
mr:अनंतपूर
new:अनन्तपुर
pnb:اننت پور
pl:Anantapur (miasto)
pt:Anantapur
ru:Анантапур (город, Андхра-Прадеш)
sv:Anantapur
ta:அனந்தபூர்
te:అనంతపురం జిల్లా
vi:Anantapur